Ndaragwa Constituency is an electoral constituency in Kenya. It is one of five constituencies in Nyandarua County. The constituency has four wards, all of which elect councillors for the Nyandarua County Council. The constituency was established for the 1988 elections.

Members of Parliament

Wards

References

External links 

Constituencies in Nyandarua County
Constituencies in Central Province (Kenya)
1988 establishments in Kenya
Constituencies established in 1988